Ken Cameron (31 January 1934 – 29 March 2005) was an  Australian rules footballer who played with Geelong in the Victorian Football League (VFL).

Notes

External links 

1934 births
2005 deaths
Australian rules footballers from Victoria (Australia)
Geelong Football Club players
People educated at Geelong College